Robyn Elaine Blackman (born 12 March 1959 in Carterton, New Zealand) is a former field hockey player from New Zealand, who was a member of the national team that finished sixth at the 1984 Summer Olympics in Los Angeles, California.

References
 New Zealand Olympic Committee

External links
 

New Zealand female field hockey players
Olympic field hockey players of New Zealand
Field hockey players at the 1984 Summer Olympics
1959 births
Living people
People from Carterton, New Zealand
20th-century New Zealand women
21st-century New Zealand women